Frank Kelly Freas (August 27, 1922 – January 2, 2005) was an American science fiction and fantasy artist with a career spanning more than 50 years. He was known as the "Dean of Science Fiction Artists" and he was the second artist inducted by the Science Fiction Hall of Fame.

Early life, education, and personal life

Born in Hornell, New York, Freas (pronounced like "freeze") was the son of two photographers, and was raised in Canada. He was educated at Lafayette High School in Buffalo, where he received training from long-time art teacher Elizabeth Weiffenbach. He entered the United States Army Air Forces right out of high school (Crystal Beach, Ontario, Canada). He flew as camera man for reconnaissance in the South Pacific and painted bomber noses during World War II. He then worked for Curtiss-Wright for a brief period, then went to study at The Art Institute of Pittsburgh and began to work in advertising. His first marriage was in 1948 to Nina Vaccaro, though they later divorced.  He later married Pauline (Polly) Bussard in 1952; they had two children, Jacqui and Jerry. Polly died of cancer in January 1987. In 1988 he married (and is survived by) Dr. Laura Brodian.

Career
Freas began his work as a commercial artist in the late 1940s, mostly for television. His goal was to become a science fiction artist.

The fantasy magazine Weird Tales published the first cover art by Freas on its November 1950 issue: "The Piper" illustrating "The Third Shadow" by H. Russell Wakefield. His second was a year later in the same magazine, followed by several  Planet Stories or Weird Tales covers and interior illustrations for three Gnome Press books in 1952. With his illustrating career underway, he continued to devise unique and imaginative concepts for other fantasy and science fiction magazines of that period. In a field where airbrushing is common practice, paintings by Freas are notable for his use of bold brush strokes, and a study of his work reveals his experimentation with a wide variety of tools and techniques.

Over the next five decades, he created covers for hundreds of books and magazines (and much more interior artwork), notably Astounding Science Fiction, both before and after its title change to Analog, from 1953 to 2003. He started at Mad magazine in February 1957 and by July 1958 was the magazine's new cover artist; he painted most of its covers until October 1962 (featuring the iconic character, Alfred E. Neuman). He also created cover illustrations for DAW, Signet, Ballantine Books, Avon, all 58 Laser Books (which are now collectors' items), and over 90 covers for Ace books alone. He was editor and artist for the first ten Starblaze books. He illustrated the cover of Jean Shepherd, Ian Ballantine, and Theodore Sturgeon's literary hoax, I, Libertine (Ballantine Books, 1956). That same year he drew cartoon illustrations for Bernard Shir-Cliff's The Wild Reader.

Freas also painted insignia and posters for Skylab I; pinup girls on bombers while in the United States Army Air Forces; comic book covers; the covers of the GURPS worldbooks Lensman and Planet Krishna; and more than 500 saints' portraits for the Franciscans executed simultaneously with his portraits of Alfred E. Neuman for Mad. He was very active in gaming and medical illustration. His cover of Queen's album News of the World (1977) was a pastiche of his October 1953 cover illustration for Tom Godwin's "The Gulf Between" for Astounding Science Fiction magazine.

Freas published several collections of his color and black-and-white artwork in the volumes Frank Kelly Freas: The Art of Science Fiction and Frank Kelly Freas: As Others See it, as well as in a spiral-bound collection of his black-and-white illustrations from Astounding Science Fiction. He also frequently gave art presentations, and his work appeared in numerous exhibitions. He was among several of the inaugural recipients of the Hugo Award for Best Artist in 1955 and was recipient under different names of the next three conferred in 1956, 1958, and 1959. With six more Hugo awards to his name (1970 and 1972–76), he became the first person to receive ten Hugo awards (he was nominated 20 times). No other artist in science fiction has consistently matched his record and output.

Freas was twice a Guest of Honor at Worldcon, at Chicon IV in 1982 and at Torcon 3 in 2003, although a fall suffered shortly before the latter convention precluded him from attending.

He died in West Hills, California and is buried in Oakwood Memorial Park Cemetery in Chatsworth.

Awards

Freas's achievements include the Doctor of Arts, Art Institute of Pittsburgh, December 2003. The Science Fiction Hall of Fame inducted him in 2006, the second artist after Chesley Bonestell.

 Hugo Awards (11): Hugo Award for Best Artist 1955–56, 1958–59, 1970, 1972–76; fifty-year Retrospective Hugo, 2001 (for 1950 work)
 Locus Awards (4), 1972–75, best artist
 Frank R. Paul Award, 1977
 Inkpot Award, 1979
 Edward E. Smith Memorial Award for Imaginative Fiction (the Skylark), 1981
 Rova Award, 1981
 Lensman Award, 1982
 Phoenix Award, 1982
 Los Angeles Science Fiction Society Service Award, 1983
 Neographics Award, 1985
 Daedalus Life Achievement Award, 1987
 Art Teacher Emeritus Award, 1988
 Best Professional, Media, International Fantasy Expo, 1989
 Chesley Awards (3): 1990 with Laura Freas, best 1989 cover illustration; 1994, artistic achievement; 2001, artistic achievement
 Numerous Science Fiction Art Show Awards
 National Association of Trade and Technical Schools National Hall of Fame, 1991
 AnLab (Analog magazine) Reader Polls, Best Cover, 1992 and 2001

Bibliography
 New Worlds of Fantasy (1967)
 New Worlds of Fantasy#2 (1970)

See also

Notes

References

Further reading
 Freas, Frank Kelly. Frank Kelly Freas: The Art of Science Fiction. Norfolk, Virginia: Donning, 1977.
 Freas, Frank Kelly.   "A Separate Star"
 Freas, Frank Kelly.   "As He Sees It"

External links

  (KellyFreas.com)
 Kelly Freas tribute site
 
 "United States Social Security Death Index," database, FamilySearch (https://familysearch.org/ark:/61903/1:1:VSC4-Z6Y : accessed July 31, 2015), Frank Kelly Freas, January 2, 2005; citing U.S. Social Security Administration, Death Master File, database (Alexandria, Virginia: National Technical Information Service, ongoing).

Biography and criticism
Frank Kelly Freas obituary in The Guardian

Bibliography and works
 
 
 
 Complete list of Freas' work for MAD Magazine
 Time Crime, by H. Beam Piper, illustrated by Freas, from Project Gutenberg
 

 

1922 births
2005 deaths
20th-century American painters
Album-cover and concert-poster artists
American comics artists
American illustrators
American male painters
American speculative fiction artists
Analog Science Fiction and Fact people
Art Institute of Pittsburgh alumni
Artists from Buffalo, New York
Burials at Oakwood Memorial Park Cemetery
Fantasy artists
Game artists
Hugo Award-winning artists
Inkpot Award winners
Lafayette High School (Buffalo, New York) alumni
Medical illustrators
Painters from New York (state)
People from Hornell, New York
Pulp fiction artists
Role-playing game artists
Science Fiction Hall of Fame inductees
Science fiction artists
United States Army Air Forces personnel of World War II
United States Army Air Forces soldiers